"Function and Concept" (German: "Funktion und Begriff", "Function and Concept") is a lecture delivered by Gottlob Frege in 1891. The lecture involves a clarification of his earlier distinction between concepts and objects. It was first published as an article in 1962.

Overview
In general, a concept is a function whose value is always a truth value (139). A relation is a two place function whose value is always a truth value (146).

Frege draws an important distinction between concepts on the basis of their level. Frege tells us that a first-level concept is a one-place function that correlates objects with truth-values (147).  First level concepts have the value of true or false depending on whether the object falls under the concept. So, the concept  has the value the True with the argument the object named by 'Jamie' if and only if Jamie falls under the concept  (or is in the extension of F).

Second order concepts correlate concepts and relations with truth values. So, if we take the relation of identity to be the argument , the concept expressed by the sentence:

correlates the relation of identity with the True.

The conceptual range (Begriffsumfang in Frege 1891, p. 16) follows the truth value of the function:

 and  have the same conceptual range.

Translations
 "On Function and Concept" in Michael Beaney, ed., The Frege Reader, Blackwell, 1997, pp. 130–148

References

External links
 "Logical Constants"
 "Chronological Catalog of Frege's Work"
 List of English translations

1891 essays
Philosophy essays
Philosophy of language
Works by Gottlob Frege
Logic literature